The Province of Cape of Good Hope Official Gazette was the government gazette of the Province of the Cape of Good Hope.

It was published in Cape Town from June 1910 and replaced the Cape of Good Hope Government Gazette (1826-1910) when Cape Colony became a Province.

See also
List of British colonial gazettes

References

Cape of Good Hope
Newspapers established in 1910
1910 establishments in South Africa